Royal Canadian Air Force (RCAF) Station Flin Flon is located near the town of Flin Flon, Manitoba, Canada.

The station operated underground seismic detectors and electro-magnetic wave detector direction finder equipment to support Canada's contribution to the Atomic Energy Detection System (AEDS).

References

Flin Flon
Flin Flon